is a Japanese graphic artist who previously worked at Game Freak and TOYBOX Inc. She designed a number of creatures for the Pokémon franchise, including one of the most well-known Pokémon species, the franchise's mascot Pikachu.

Career 
Nishida was working at Game Freak on the game Pulseman with the art director for Pokémon, Ken Sugimori. In his initial character design, Sugimori made most of the Pokémon scary, but he realized he also wanted to have cute characters in the game. This led to the design of Pikachu, which was originally based on a daifuku, a Japanese sweet treat. Nishida changed the design later, basing it on a squirrel, as Nishida said she was obsessed with squirrels at the time. Squirrels were also her inspiration for the electric cheeks, as they tend to store food in their cheeks. Pikachu was later changed to be a mouse by Satoshi Tajiri, one of the Pokémon creators. The original design included the Raichu evolution, as well as a third evolution, which was later abandoned.

Nishida’s other Pokémon design credits include Bulbasaur, Charmander, and Squirtle. She furthermore designed some of the Eevee evolutions (or "Eeveelutions"), including Glaceon and Sylveon. On Sugimori's request, she helped design Xerneas and Yveltal, the two legendary Pokémon that appear on the covers of the Pokémon X and Y games. She was also the artist on a large number of Pokémon Trading Card Game cards, including the Pikachu Illustrator card, which was sold for $195,000 in 2019, winning it the Guinness World Record of most expensive Pokémon trading card (at auction). This beat the previous record from 2016 when a card with the same design by Nishida was sold for $54,970.

Nishida also worked for the Japanese game development studio TOYBOX Inc. on Hometown Story, a Nintendo 3DS game.

Personal life 
Nishida is a very private person; she spent the entirety of a 2018 interview hidden behind a giant Pikachu plush doll.

References

External links 
 Pokemon Trading Card Game cards designed by Nishida

Pokémon
Japanese illustrators
Japanese graphic designers
Year of birth missing (living people)
Living people
Nintendo people